is the debut single by Japanese singer Ringo Sheena and it was released on May 27, 1998 by  Toshiba EMI, East World.
Since Sheena suddenly gained popularity, it was decided that this single was resold as a 12 cm single. 
New edition, including the new song, was re-released with the fourth single "Honnō" on October 27, 1999. The 1999 edition was certified gold by the RIAJ for 200,000 copies shipped to stores.

Background 
"Kōfukuron" and "Suberidai" were produced by Hiroshi Kitashiro, who is an audio engineer and synthesizer programmer, and "Toki ga Bōsō Suru" was produced by Uni Inoue, who is an audio engineer and multi-instrumentalist. Seiji Kameda arranged all songs. Sheena wanted to release not "Kōfukuron" but B-side song "Suberidai" as a title tune. However, she gave up on the idea because of opposition from EMI staff.

Since Sheena was not pleased with the arrangement of "Kōfukuron," the single version was not included in the album. The song was used as the theme song to the TBS variety show Ai no Hinadan, and the "Etsuraku-hen" version featured on Muzai Moratorium, in a 1999 commercial for Suntory's The Cocktail Bar Cassis & Orange.

The song was covered as a part of a medley by Rie Tomosaka on the television show The Yoru mo Hippare on September 9, 2000. It was later covered by Arashi members Jun Matsumoto and Masaki Aiba on their 2002 concert Arashi Storm Concert Tour 2003 "Atarashi Arashi".

Track listing

Chart rankings

Sales and certifications

Credits and personnel 
Kōfukuron
 Synthesizer Programming: Hiroshi Kitashiro 
 
 Vocals: Ringo Sheena
 Electric Guitar: Susumu Nishikawa
 Electric Bass: Seiji Kameda
 Drums: Noriyasu "Kāsuke" Kawamura

Suberidai
 Vocals: Ringo Sheena
 Electric Guitar, Acoustic Guitar: Susumu Nishikawa
 Contrabass: Hitoshi Watanabe 
 Synthesizer Programming: Hiroshi Kitashiro

Toki ga Bōsō Suru
 Vocals, Piano: Ringo Sheena
 Drums: Masayuki Muraishi 
 Synthesizer Programming: Nobuhiko Nakayama

References 

Ringo Sheena songs
1998 songs
1998 debut singles
1999 singles
Songs written by Ringo Sheena
Song recordings produced by Seiji Kameda